Michael Joseph McPhee (born July 14, 1960) is a Canadian former ice hockey forward.

Playing career

McPhee began his professional career with the Nova Scotia Voyageurs of the American Hockey League, after being selected in the sixth-round (124th overall) of the 1980 NHL Entry Draft by the Montreal Canadiens. He began his NHL career with Montreal in 1984. McPhee was a member of Montreal's Stanley Cup winning team in 1986. His best NHL season came in 1987-88, with linemates Guy Carbonneau and Russ Courtnall, when he scored 23 goals and 43 points. The following season, he took part in the only NHL All-Star Game of his career. He was also a three-time winner of the Jacques Beauchamp Trophy as the Montreal Canadiens’ unsung hero.

McPhee was traded to the Minnesota North Stars on August 14, 1992 in exchange for a 5th round pick (Jeff Lank) in the 1993 NHL Entry Draft. While in Minnesota, McPhee was a favourite of head coach Bob Gainey, who rewarded McPhee for his two-way style, which was similar to Gainey's.

When the North Stars relocated to Dallas prior to the 1993-94 season, McPhee followed and continued to thrive while playing his defensive game. McPhee was forced to retire following the season due to a recurring knee injury.

Personal life

McPhee was born on July 14, 1960 in Sydney, Nova Scotia to Stan and Monica McPhee, but grew up in the small community of River Bourgeois, Nova Scotia

McPhee earned a civil engineering degree at Rensselaer Polytechnic Institute, where he was a standout player for the Engineers before making his professional debut in 1982. After retiring from the NHL, he attended the University of Dallas where he received his  MBA. He is currently working as a financial advisor for National Bank of Canada in Halifax, Nova Scotia.

He currently serves on the board of KidSport Canada and Sport Nova Scotia, as well as the Campaign Chair for United Way in the Halifax Region. He is also part of the organizing committee for the Heart & Stroke Foundation's Hockey Heros Weekend, and the Danny Gallivan Cystic Fibrosis Golf Tournament.

McPhee is married to Jane Anne McPhee. The couple has two children together Aly (b.1989) and Adam (b.1987)

McPhee's daughter Aly was a track & field athlete at McGill University. Aly won six gold medals and a silver in five meets during the 2007 season. This included three gold in high jump and one as the anchor of McGill's 4x200-metre relay team. She also competed for Team Nova Scotia at the 2005 Canada Summer Games and 2006 Canadian junior track-and-field championships.

Career statistics

Boldface denotes career high in each statistics.

Awards and achievements

NHL All-Star Game roster - 1989
Stanley Cup champion - 1986
Jacques Beauchamp Molson Trophy - 1988, 1990, 1991
Inducted into the Nova Scotia Sports Hall of Fame - 1999
Inducted into the Cape Breton Sports Hall of Fame
National Bank Financial Wealth Management Excellence Award. Ottawa/Gatineau & Atlantic - 2012

References

External links

Stats, awards and honors

1960 births
Canadian ice hockey forwards
Dallas Stars players
Ice hockey people from Nova Scotia
Living people
Minnesota North Stars players
Montreal Canadiens draft picks
Montreal Canadiens players
National Hockey League All-Stars
Nova Scotia Voyageurs players
People from Richmond County, Nova Scotia
People from Sydney, Nova Scotia
Nova Scotia Sport Hall of Fame inductees
RPI Engineers men's ice hockey players
Stanley Cup champions